Caligula kitchingi is a moth of the  family Saturniidae. It is endemic to Shaanxi in China.

External links
Species info

Caligula (moth)
Moths described in 2001